Jani Virtanen (born March 1, 1977 in Tampere, Finland) is a Finnish former professional ice hockey defenceman.

Career
Virtanen began his career in 1993 with Tappara, playing in their junior teams at under-18 and under-20 level as well as one game for the main senior team during the 1997-98 season. He had spells with third-tier team Titaanit and second-tier team Hermes, where he scored a career high 10 goals and 17 points, before returning to SM-liiga with HPK for the 2000-01 season, which included single game stints at Hermes and FPS in the newly formed second-tier Mestis.

Virtanen then divided the next two season with SaiPa and Espoo Blues as well as a stint in Sweden's Elitserien with Färjestads BK. In 2003, he moved to North America and signed with the Bakersfield Condors of the ECHL where he scored a career high 10 assists.

He then moved to Italy's Serie A with SG Brunico as well as a two-game stint with Scorpions de Mulhouse in France's Ligue Magnus before returning to Scandinavia and to Sweden in 2005, this time with the Malmö Redhawks of the second-tier HockeyAllsvenskan. After 17 games, he departed and moved to Denmark to sign for EfB Ishockey in the Metal Ligaen

Virtanen then had spells with SV Kaltern in Italy's Serie B, the Hull Stingrays of the Elite Ice Hockey League in the United Kingdom and a return to Ligue Magnus with Bisons de Neuilly-sur-Marne before retiring in 2009.

External links

1977 births
Bakersfield Condors (1998–2015) players
Bisons de Neuilly-sur-Marne players
Brunico SG players
EfB Ishockey players
Espoo Blues players
Färjestad BK players
Finnish ice hockey defencemen
HPK players
Hull Stingrays players
Kokkolan Hermes players
Living people
Malmö Redhawks players
Ice hockey people from Tampere
SaiPa players
Tappara players